Bankivia is a genus of sea snails, marine gastropod mollusks in the family Trochidae, the top snails.

Description
The imperforate, elongated, narrow, thin shell has a conical shape. It is slightly pearly. The aperture is small, about one-third the length of shell . The columella is slightly twisted, and subtruncated toward the base.

Species
Species within the genus Bankivia include:
 Bankivia fasciata (Menke, 1830)

The following species were brought into synonymy:
 Bankivia lugubris Gould, 1861: synonym of Bankivia fasciata (Menke, 1830)
 Bankivia major A. Adams, 1853: synonym of Bankivia fasciata (Menke, 1830)
 Bankivia nitida A. Adams, 1853: synonym of Bankivia fasciata (Menke, 1830)
 Bankivia purpurascens A. Adams, 1853: synonym of Bankivia fasciata (Menke, 1830)
 Bankivia varians Krauss, 1848: synonym of Bankivia fasciata (Menke, 1830)

References

External links

 
Trochidae
Monotypic gastropod genera